Ritu Porna Chakma (born 30 December 2003; Chakma: 𑄢𑄨𑄖𑄪 𑄛𑄧𑄢𑄴𑄚 𑄌𑄋𑄴𑄟𑄳𑄦, Bangla: ঋতু পর্ণা চাকমা) is a Bangladeshi footballer who plays as a midfielder for the Bangladesh national team.

Career
In 2021, Chakma scored double goal against Sri Lanka at Bir Shrestha Shaheed Shipahi Mostafa Kamal Stadium in the capital on Sunday. Finishing the first half 3–0 ahead, Tohura Khatun and Shahada Akter Ripa shot two each for Bangladesh, while Chakma and captain Maria Manda supported them with one goal each. She was part of the squad that won the 2022 SAFF Women's Championship.

Career statistics
Scores and results list Templatonia's goal tally first, score column indicates score after each Chakma goal.

References

External links
 

2003 births
Living people
21st-century Bangladeshi women
Bangladesh women's international footballers
People from Rangamati District
Women's association football midfielders
Bashundhara Kings players
Bangladesh Women's Football League players
Bangladeshi women's footballers
Chakma people
Bangladeshi Buddhists